Beat Meier (7 March 1959 – 2016) was a Swiss biathlete. He competed in the 20 km individual event at the 1984 Winter Olympics.

References

External links
 

1959 births
2016 deaths
Swiss male biathletes
Olympic biathletes of Switzerland
Biathletes at the 1984 Winter Olympics
People from Chur
Sportspeople from Graubünden